Bruce Channel (born November 28, 1940) is an American singer-songwriter best known for his 1962 million-selling number-one hit record, "Hey! Baby".

Career
Channel performed originally for the radio program Louisiana Hayride and then joined with the harmonica player Delbert McClinton, singing country music. Channel wrote "Hey! Baby" with Margaret Cobb in 1959 and performed the song for two years before recording it for Fort Worth record producer Bill Smith. It was issued originally on Smith's LeCam label, but as it started to sell well, it was acquired for distribution by Smash Records, a subsidiary of Mercury. The song went to number one in the US in March 1962 and held that position for three weeks. Besides topping the U.S. popular music charts, it also became number two in the United Kingdom. It sold more than one million copies and was awarded a gold disc. Channel had four more singles on the Billboard Hot 100, including "Number One Man" (which peaked at number 52), "Come On Baby" (number 98), "Going Back to Louisiana" (number 89), and "Mr. Bus Driver" (number 90, produced by Dale Hawkins in Memphis and recorded by Terry Manning), but none of them was as successful as "Hey! Baby", and he is considered a one-hit wonder.

Channel toured Europe and was assisted at one gig by the Beatles, who were then little known. John Lennon, who had "Hey! Baby" on his jukebox, was fascinated by McClinton's harmonica. A popular legend is that Lennon was taught to play harmonica by McClinton, but by that time Lennon had already been playing the instrument live for some time. The harmonica segment in "Hey! Baby" inspired Lennon's playing on the Beatles' first single, 1962's "Love Me Do", as well as later Beatles records, and the harmonica break on Frank Ifield's "I Remember You."

Channel's only other top 40 recording in the UK Singles Chart was "Keep On" (June 1968), which reached number 12; it was written by Wayne Carson Thompson and produced by Dale Hawkins. "Keep On" also charted in Australia. Channel disliked touring, so he settled as a songwriter in Nashville, scoring a number of Broadcast Music Incorporated award-winning songs during the 1970s and 1980s – "As Long As I'm Rockin' with You", for John Conlee; "Don't Worry 'bout Me Baby", for Janie Fricke; "Party Time", for T. G. Sheppard; "You're the Best", for Kieran Kane; and "Stand Up", for Mel McDaniel. In 1987, "Hey! Baby" was featured in the popular movie Dirty Dancing.

In 1995, Channel recorded his cover of the song "Stand Up" for the Memphis-based record label Ice House. Delbert McClinton reprised his harmonica role on it and several other tracks, including another version of "Hey! Baby". Channel then recorded a project in 2002 with the singer-songwriter Larry Henley (ex-Newbeats), billed as Original Copy.

Channel was inducted into the Rockabilly Hall of Fame. He continues to perform in cruises with other 1960s musicians.

See also
List of 1960s one-hit wonders in the United States
List of artists who reached number one in the United States
List of performers on Top of the Pops

References

External links
[ Biography at Allmusic.com]

American country singer-songwriters
American male singer-songwriters
1940 births
Living people
People from Jacksonville, Texas
Charay Records artists
Apex Records artists
Smash Records artists
King Records artists
Singer-songwriters from Texas
Country musicians from Texas